Aphomia odontella is a species of snout moth in the genus Aphomia. It was described by George Hampson in 1898 and is known from Sri Lanka.

References

Moths described in 1898
Tirathabini
Moths of Sri Lanka